The Loyola Greyhounds women's basketball team represents Loyola University Maryland in NCAA Division I competition. It became a member of the Patriot League along with the university's other intercollegiate athletic programs on July 1, 2013, after leaving the Metro Atlantic Athletic Conference, which it had been a member of since 1989.

Coaching
Danielle O'Banion – Head Coach (since 2021)
Jenna Loschiavo – Assistant Coach
Maya Wynn - Assistant Coach

Conference history
ECAC Cosmopolitan: 1985–1986 (5–10 all time conference record)
ECAC Metro: 1986–1989 (15–33 all time conference record)
MAAC: 1989–2013 (193–208 all time conference record)
Patriot League: 2014–present

Postseason

NCAA Tournament appearances

WNIT appearances

Coaching history
Stats updated as of the 2020–21 season.

References

External links